Peter F. Hartman (born 1949 in Curaçao) is a Dutch executive and vice-chairman of Air France-KLM. He served as CEO of KLM until 2013.

After graduating from high school in 1967, Hartman studied mechanical engineering in Amsterdam, followed by business economics at Erasmus University in Rotterdam, where he received his master's degree.   Hartman joined KLM on October 29, 1973 as an employment analyst for the Controller’s Department at Engineering & Maintenance (E&M).  In the years that followed he held various positions as controller in the Netherlands and abroad.
In 1984, Hartman was appointed Managing Director Technical Contract Services and in 1987 he was appointed Project Manager, Schiphol 2000.
On January 1, 1989, he became Vice President KLM Ground Services, Schiphol. In this capacity he was responsible for all handling processes at Schiphol and at all outstations in KLM’s route network.
Hartman became Senior Vice President Customer Services on October 1, 1990, and in April 1994, he was appointed Executive Vice President Personnel & Organization.
On January 1, 1996, Hartman took up the post of Executive Vice President E&M, followed by his appointment on August 6, 1997 to the KLM Board of Managing Directors as COO and later as Deputy CEO. Hartman was appointed KLM President & CEO on April 1, 2007.

Hartman is also a member of the following bodies:
The Supervisory Board of Kenya Airways Group 
The Supervisory Board of Stork B.V.
The Supervisory Board of CAI – Compagnia Aerea Italiana S.p.A. (Alitalia)
The Supervisory Board of the Rotterdam School of Management, Erasmus University
The Supervisory Board of Delta Lloyd Group
Vice Chairman ACARE advisory council for aeronautics research in Europe (workgroup European Commission)

Hartman is a former member of the following bodies:
Chairman of the IATA Board of Governors
The Supervisory Board of transavia.com
The Supervisory Board of RAI Amsterdam
Chairman of the Association of European Airlines

References

Living people
Dutch chief executives in the airline industry
Air France–KLM
1949 births
Chief operating officers